Syringoseca mimica is a moth of the family Oecophoridae. It is known from the Australian Capital Territory, New South Wales, Queensland, South Australia, Tasmania, Victoria and Western Australia.

The wingspan is about 20 mm. Adults have brown forewings with darker patches and speckles.

The larvae feed on the green leaves of Eucalyptus tereticornis. They live in a silken tube between tied leaves. Pupation takes place in portable case of leaves.

References

Oecophorinae